Egypt competed at the 1988 Summer Paralympics in Seoul, South Korea.

Medals 
46 competitors from Egypt won 7 medals including 1 gold, 3 silver and 3 bronze and finished 34th in the medal table.

Powerlifting 
Egypt won two silver medals in powerlifting at the 1988 Games.

See also 
 Egypt at the Paralympics
 Egypt at the 1988 Summer Olympics

References 

Nations at the 1988 Summer Paralympics
1988
Summer Paralympics